WKZV may refer to:

 WKZV (FM), a radio station (102.1 FM) licensed to serve Tybee Island, Georgia, United States
 WKZV (Pennsylvania), a defunct radio station (1110 AM) formerly licensed to serve Washington, Pennsylvania, United States